The Anglican Diocese of Grafton is one of the 23 dioceses of the Anglican Church of Australia. The diocese is located in north-east New South Wales and covers the area from the Queensland border to Port Macquarie in the south and west to the Great Dividing Range.

Created in 1914 as a result of a division of the previous Diocese of Grafton and Armidale it has 22 parishes and 3 transitional ministry districts  and an Anglicare organisation seeking to support community and social needs within the diocese. The cathedral church is the Cathedral Church of Christ the King in Grafton.

The Church of St Thomas at Port Macquarie was built by an early Governor of New South Wales, Thomas Brisbane. It is the fifth oldest church building in Australia.

The current Bishop of Grafton, Murray Harvey, is the 12th bishop of the diocese. He was installed at Christ Church Cathedral, Grafton, on 29 September 2018.

Sarah Macneil the 11th Bishop of Grafton become the first woman to lead an Australian diocese as bishop. Macneil announced her resignation on 17 November 2017, to be effective from 3 March 2018.

The bishop is based in Grafton.

Bishops

Cathedral
The cathedral church is Christ Church Cathedral in Grafton which was designed by John Horbury Hunt and commenced in 1884 during the episcopacy of Bishop James Turner and completed to its present stage in 1937. The building is of brick construction in a Gothic Revival style with towering arches and ornate stained glass windows. An organ was installed in 1884 by George Fincham of Melbourne which was replaced in 1992 by a 1903 instrument brought from London by Peter D.G. Jewkes Pty Ltd of Sydney.

The cathedral is a National Trust listed building.

Deans of Grafton
The following individuals have served as Deans of Grafton:

Church schools
The diocese also has a number of church-based schools providing education across a range of age groups.

References

External links 
 

Grafton
1914 establishments in Australia
Anglican Church of Australia Ecclesiastical Province of New South Wales
Grafton, New South Wales
John Horbury Hunt buildings